Dean Pacheco (born 5 August 1972) is a Trinidadian retired footballer.

Career statistics

International

International goals
Scores and results list Trinidad and Tobago's goal tally first.

References

1969 births
Living people
Trinidad and Tobago footballers
Trinidad and Tobago under-20 international footballers
Trinidad and Tobago international footballers
Association football forwards
Police F.C. (Trinidad and Tobago) players
United Petrotrin F.C. players
People from Diego Martin region